Vladyslav Viktorovych Zubkov (born 8 April 1971) is a Ukrainian professional football coach and a former player.

Club career
He made his professional debut in the Soviet Second League in 1990 for SKA Odessa.

Honours
 USSR Federation Cup winner: 1990.
 Ukrainian Premier League runner-up: 1995, 1996.
 Ukrainian Premier League bronze: 2001.
 Kazakhstan Premier League champion: 2002.

European club competitions
 1996 UEFA Intertoto Cup with FC KAMAZ-Chally Naberezhnye Chelny: 6 games.
 1997 UEFA Intertoto Cup with FC Lokomotiv Nizhny Novgorod: 6 games.

References

1971 births
Footballers from Odesa
Living people
Soviet footballers
Ukrainian footballers
Ukrainian expatriate footballers
Russian footballers
Russian expatriate footballers
Expatriate footballers in Kazakhstan
Russian expatriate sportspeople in Kazakhstan
Ukrainian expatriate sportspeople in Kazakhstan
Ukrainian Premier League players
SC Odesa players
FC Metalurh Zaporizhzhia players
FC KAMAZ Naberezhnye Chelny players
Russian Premier League players
FC Chornomorets Odesa players
FC Chornomorets-2 Odesa players
FC Lokomotiv Nizhny Novgorod players
FC Dnipro players
FC Dnipro-2 Dnipropetrovsk players
FC Dnipro-3 Dnipropetrovsk players
FC Irtysh Pavlodar players
FC Sokol Saratov players
Russian football managers
Ukrainian football managers
FC Chornomorets-2 Odesa managers
FC Real Pharma Odesa managers
Association football midfielders
K. D. Ushinsky South Ukrainian National Pedagogical University alumni